Serena Williams was the defending champion and chose not to compete this year.

Anastasia Myskina won the title, defeating Justine Henin-Hardenne in the final 3–6, 6–3, 6–3.

Seeds
The top four seeds received a bye to the second round.

Draw

Finals

Top half

Bottom half

Qualifying

Seeds

Qualifiers

Qualifying draw

First qualifier

Second qualifier

Third qualifier

Fourth qualifier

External links
 2003 Sparkassen Cup Draw

Singles 2003
2003 WTA Tour